Silent Waters is the eighth studio album by Finnish heavy metal band Amorphis.

The lyrics are English translations of Finnish poems written by poet Pekka Kainulainen, who wrote them based on the character of Lemminkäinen in the Kalevala.

In February 2008, the record was certified gold in Finland, having sold over 15,000 units.

Track listing

Credits

Amorphis 
 Tomi Joutsen − vocals
 Esa Holopainen − lead guitar
 Tomi Koivusaari − rhythm guitar
 Niclas Etelävuori − bass guitar
 Santeri Kallio − keyboards
 Jan Rechberger − drums

Other personnel 
 Marko Hietala − backing vocals
 Pekka Kainulainen − lyrics

References 

Amorphis albums
Nuclear Blast albums
2007 albums
Albums with cover art by Travis Smith (artist)
Music based on the Kalevala